Matthias Heidrich (born 10 December 1977, in Hoyerswerda) is a German former professional footballer who played as a defensive midfielder. He works for 1. FC Köln as head of youth department.

References

1977 births
Living people
People from Hoyerswerda
German footballers
Association football midfielders
Alemannia Aachen players
FC Erzgebirge Aue players
VfL Osnabrück players
SV Wacker Burghausen players
Bundesliga players
2. Bundesliga players
3. Liga players
Footballers from Saxony